Bektur Amangeldiev (born 20 November 1998) is a Kyrgyz professional footballer who plays as a midfielder for Rajasthan United in the I-League.

Club career

Earlier career
Amangeldiev started his football career at Dinamo-Manas. In 2016, he made a move to Abdysh-Ata Kant II. After spending two years at the club, he shifted base to Ilbirs Bishkek. The following year saw the midfielder join Kaganat. The player’s then piled his trade with Dordoi Bishkek in January, 2022.

Amangeldiev played 37 matches, until 2022, in the Kyrgyz Premier League. In the process, he has also netted two goals. Also, despite being a midfielder, the 23-year-old can pitch in as a centre-back at times.

Rajasthan United
In August 2022, Amangeldiev moved abroad for the first time and signed with I-League club Rajasthan United, on a one-year deal. On 20 August, he scored on his debut in a shock 3–2 win over ATK Mohun Bagan, in the Durand Cup.

Career statistics

Club

Honours
Rajasthan United
Baji Rout Cup: 2022

References

External links
Bektur Amangeldiev at Flashscore

Kyrgyzstani footballers
Rajasthan United FC players
Living people
1998 births

People from Bishkek